SARI Screening Tool also known as SARI score is a tool developed by the Ministry of Health in the Kingdom of Saudi Arabia.  It is a visual triage used to identify those with potential to have COVID-19. The tools was also used to screen for MERS.  It has been modified multiple times and the weights of each symptom have been changed over time as well.

References

Medical terminology
COVID-19 models